James Hibberd is an American journalist and screenwriter. He is a current Editor at Large for The Hollywood Reporter again after a ten year stint at Entertainment Weekly.  His work has been published in publications including The New York Times, Salon, Details, Cosmopolitan, and Amnesty International Magazine.

Career
Hibberd is a graduate of the University of Texas journalism program. He worked at the Austin American-Statesman and later moved to Phoenix, Arizona and worked as a staff writer for the Phoenix New Times.

From 2003 to 2008 he worked for TelevisionWeek becoming senior editor of the publication. In 2008 Hibberd joined The Hollywood Reporter as a senior television reporter, and went on to become the television editor for the publication. From 2010 to 2021 he was at Entertainment Weekly, before returning to The Hollywood Reporter in March 2021.

Hibberd co-wrote the screenplay Waco with Rupert Wainwright about the Waco siege, after spending a year researching the story. Hibberd wrote the screenplay to the film Tell Me How I Die which was released in 2016 to mixed reviews.

Controversy
In 2001, while a writer at the Phoenix New Times, Hibberd conducted an interview with an active serial eco-arsonist who had not yet been captured by police. After the interview Hibberd declined to assist in the investigation, and refused to turn over any of his interview notes or other materials to investigators despite being subpoenaed to do so. Some criticized Hibberd’s decision, including The Arizona Republic and the mayor of Phoenix, who accused him of assisting the arsonist. A judge ruled that Hibberd was not legally obligated to hand over any material to police as the arsonist was a protected source. The arsonist was later apprehended.

References

External links
 James Hibberd on Twitter

Year of birth missing (living people)
Living people
American male journalists
21st-century American journalists
University of Texas alumni
American television critics
21st-century American screenwriters
21st-century American male writers